24 Karat Gold: Songs from the Vault is the eighth solo studio album by the American singer-songwriter and Fleetwood Mac vocalist Stevie Nicks, released on September 30, 2014, through Reprise Records.

Background
Recorded in Nashville and Los Angeles, the album includes new versions of demos that Nicks primarily recorded between 1969 and 1987, though two songs date back to 1994 and 1995. There is one cover on the album, "Carousel", a song originally written and performed by Vanessa Carlton on her album Rabbits on the Run (2011). Nicks put it on the album because it was her mother's favorite song in her last days and Carlton was present during her death. Nicks was inspired to record the album after her assistant showed her bootlegs on YouTube of the demos Nicks had recorded over the years. Included on the album is "Blue Water", a song that features Lady Antebellum on vocals.

The album sold 33,000 copies in its first week of release and debuted at #7 on the Billboard 200, giving Nicks her sixth top ten album on that chart.

Release

Album
The album was released as standard and deluxe editions. The standard edition contains 14 tracks and features several previously unpublished polaroid photos of Nicks throughout her career. The limited quantity deluxe edition features a different track list order with two bonus tracks ("Twisted" and "Watch Chain") in addition to a full color 48-page photo book of never-before-released photos.
The set was also released on vinyl with the deluxe edition track listing on two 125-gram LPs housed in a gatefold package.

Singles
The album was supported by three singles. Additionally, several promotional singles were made available for download from the album prior to its release. "The Dealer", was released on August 5, 2014, followed by "Lady" on August 25, "Starshine", on September 16, and the title track on September 23, 2014.

Other songs 
On April 1, 2014, several months before the album's release, Nicks released "Golden", a duet with Lady Antebellum.

Critical reception 

24 Karat Gold: Songs from the Vault received mostly positive reviews from music critics upon its release. At Metacritic, the album has received a Metascore of 73 out of 100 based on 11 reviews, indicating "generally favorable reviews."

Stephen Thomas Erlewine of AllMusic rated the album four and a half stars out of five and calls it "the best-sounding record she's made since 1983's The Wild Heart." Writing for New York Daily News, Jim Farber gave the album three stars out of five and states: "We get pure Stevie — needier than some might find comfortable, but also unexpectedly wise. It’s too much for the casual listener but catnip for the devoted."

Commercial performance 
The album debuted on the Billboard 200 at #7 with sales of 33,000  giving Nicks her sixth top 10 album. The album also debuted on the UK Albums chart at #14 with sales of 5,508, giving Nicks her fifth UK Top 20 album.

Nicks made various TV appearances to promote the album, including the Tonight Show with Jimmy Fallon where she performed "Lady".

Track listing

Personnel 
Main Performers
Stevie Nicks – vocals, keyboards
Vanessa Carlton – backing vocals on "Carousel"
Sharon Celani – backing vocals
Lady A (Hillary Scott, Charles Kelley, Dave Haywood) – backing vocals on "Blue Water"
Jessica Nicks – backing vocals on "Carousel"
Lori Nicks – backing vocals
David A. Stewart – guitar
Waddy Wachtel – guitar, backing vocals

Session Musicians
Mike Campbell – guitar on "Starshine" and "I Don't Care"
Davey Johnstone – guitar on "Belle Fleur" and "If You Were My Love"
Ann Marie Calhoun – violin on "Carousel"
Tom Bukovac – guitar
Michael Rhodes – bass
Kieran Kiely –  accordion, ethnic flutes / whistles
Dan Dugmore – banjo
Chad Cromwell – drums
Benmont Tench – keyboards, piano
Lenny Castro – percussion

Charts

Weekly charts

Year-end charts

Release history

References 

Stevie Nicks albums
2014 albums
Albums produced by Waddy Wachtel
Albums produced by David A. Stewart
Reprise Records albums